At the 2011 census, the number of immigrants in Costa Rica totaled about 390,000 individuals, or about 9% of the country's population. Following a considerable drop from 1950 through 1980, immigration to Costa Rica has increased in recent decades.

The ethnic composition of Costa Rica consists mostly of people of European origin, with a large population of Mestizos and numerically fewer black and indigenous people.

Social impact 
Immigration to Costa Rica has caused some social problems. Although most people enter the country to seek better employment opportunities, some immigrants have been involved in criminal activities. The government of Costa Rica has tried to stop the illegal immigration of Nicaraguans and to deport those already living in Costa Rica. However, the government has also initiated programs to promote economic prosperity for the poorest immigrant populations, also hailing from Nicaragua. There are also a number of political refugees who have sought asylum from persecution in Costa Rica.

Immigrant groups 
The largest immigrant communities are from Nicaragua (74.6%), Colombia (4.3%), the United States (4.1%), Panama (2.9%) and El Salvador (2.4%). The remaining 11.7% are of other nationalities, with significant communities from China (3,281 people), Cuba (3,860 people), Honduras (3,778 people), Peru (3,404 people) and Venezuela (3,886 people). Many Europeans have immigrated to Costa Rica in recent years, especially Spaniards, Bulgarians, Russians, Ukrainians, Swiss and Swedish. There are also many Asian (Chinese, Taiwanese and Japanese) immigrants. Immigrants may be attracted by political stability, an alternative way of life and a mild climate.

Americans (US) 

Of the 16,000 Americans in the country, around half of them are under the age of 29. They mainly live in San José, Pérez Zeledón, Escazú, Alajuela, Santa Ana and Santa Cruz. American immigrants work in the fields of education, commerce, tourism, and administrative activities. About half of these immigrants have dual citizenship.

Argentines 
Costa Rica is the country with the highest population of Argentines in Central America. According to the census of 2012, there were 3,600 Argentines living in Costa Rica. Historically there were two migratory waves of refugees escaping from military dictatorships who ruled Argentina between 1976 and 1983. A second wave occurred during Argentina's economic crisis (1999-2002), when many Argentine professionals decided to migrate to Costa Rica. The largest numbers of  Argentines in Costa Rica come from Buenos Aires, Córdoba and Rosario. Most of them reside in the provinces of San José, Cartago, Limón and Guanacaste.

Belizeans 
According to the census of 2012, there are about 1,275 Belizeans in Costa Rica. Many have arrived as part of the Mormon missions. 

.

Brazilians 
According to the census of 2012, there are about 1,300 Brazilians in Costa Rica. Many of those who come are actors, actresses, models and television hosts. The Brazilians in Costa Rica live mainly in the expensive hotels in San José.

Britons 
After the independence of Costa Rica (1821), the Costa Rican government encouraged foreign immigration to strengthen the workforce. The new arrivals came mainly from Central Europe and North America, although Germans, Britons and Americans also arrived, the latter two known collectively as Anglos. Britain was the first to notice the potential that Costa Rica had to offer from coffee production; over time, agricultural areas of the Caribbean and northern Costa Rica were under British control, especially the coffee farms. Afterwards the Britons brought in Italians for construction of the railroad of Altiplano. Most of the agriculturally productive areas were held by the British.

According to the census of 2012, there are about 5,200 Britons in Costa Rica, forming the second-largest European community after the Spaniards.

Canadians 
According to the census of 2011, there are about 1,700 Canadians in Costa Rica. They mainly come from Calgary, Alberta and Ottawa. Many work in tourism and are residents on the coast, near popular beaches while others live in the cities such as San José and Santa Ana.

Chileans 
According to the census of 2012, there are nearly 2,600 Chileans living in Costa Rica. They have mostly settled in urban areas such as San José.

Chinese 

The Chinese community in Costa Rica (including Taiwanese) is the largest Asian community in the country. According with the census of 2012, there are about 4,500 Chinese living in the country. The first Chinese immigrants arrived in Costa Rica in 1855. They were a group of 77 people originally from Canton, who had come to Central America to work on the Panama Railroad. During 1859-1863 under the administration of José María Montealegre, laws were enacted that prohibited the immigration of blacks and Asians, in an effort to preserve Costa Rica for European settlement. Later, "a Chinese colony" began to form in that area, founded by Joseph Chen Apuy, an immigrant from Zhongshan, Guangdong, who arrived in 1873. The colony, named Puntarenas, was so well known in China that some thought in error that it was the name of a country. In the 1970s, Taiwan became the source of the highest number of Chinese immigrants to Costa Rica. However, many used to Costa Rica as a temporary stop while waiting for permission to live in the United States or Canada.

Colombians 
Beginning in the 1980s, Costa Rica became a refuge for thousands of Colombians who have fled the Colombian civil war.  According to the census of 2012, there are about 20,000 Colombians in Costa Rica, making it the tenth-largest community of Colombians outside the country.  Many Colombian immigrants are educated, which makes it easier for them to achieve dual citizenship. Colombians in Costa Rica are one of the fastest growing diasporas in this Central American country.

Cubans 
According to the census of 2012, there are over 1,700 Cubans living in Costa Rica. Immigration began from the 1960s through boats of refugees fleeing the dictatorship of Fidel Castro. They were attracted by the political stability of Costa Rica.

Dominicans 
According to the census of 2012, there are about 1,475 Dominicans in Costa Rica. They mainly live on the Caribbean coast.

Ecuadorians 
According to the census of 2012, there are about 900 Ecuadorians in Costa Rica. Among these are television presenters, models or entrepreneurs, commonly living in the city of San José.

El Salvador 
According to the census of 2012, there are about 7,189 Salvadorans in Costa Rica, mainly in San José. Many of them are from the upper class and looking to develop their businesses.

French 
French immigration in Costa Rica began in the 1840s. Following the victory of liberal governments, it became easier for painters, musicians and French singers to immigrate. France has contributed greatly to Costa Rican culture and influence. French composer Gabriel-Pierre Lafond was in part responsible for the national anthem of Costa Rica, the primary composer of which was Manuel María Gutiérrez. The Museum of Art was created by French sculptor Louis-Robert Carrier Belleuse, and the flag of Costa Rica was inspired by the flag of France. Costa Rica is home to about 1,000 French people, according to the census of 2012.

Germans 
The immigration of Germans to Costa Rica occurred in three main phases: prior to 1871 (the year in which the German Empire was founded), from 1871 to 1918, at the end of the First World War, and from 1918-1919 until the start of the Second World War in 1939. The first German immigrants arrived between 1825 and 1826. In 1850, the German immigration was insignificant. In 1864 there were 164 Germans living in Costa Rica. Most were attracted by the growing foreign commerce. Others migrated because of the economic situation facing Germany in the 1840s and the failed revolution in 1848. Then came another group in the late nineteenth century. There were new infrastructure projects, and existing personal networks between Germany and Costa Rica helped to increase immigration. Before the First World War, there was already a German Club, founded in 1910, and the German School which started in 1912. At the beginning of the Second World War, a third group of immigrants arrived. After the war, relations were broken between two countries, and many naturalized Germans after the war no longer appear in the statistics. Currently the census of 2012 states there are 2,100 Germans in Costa Rica.

Guatemalans 
According to the census of 2012, there are about 1,200 Guatemalans in Costa Rica. There are both economic and political migrants. Most live in San José.

Haitians 
According to the census of 2012, the Haitian community consists of 150 residents.

Hondurans 
According to the census of 2012, there are 5,669 Hondurans in Costa Rica, who live mainly in San José. Many of these immigrants arrived via Nicaragua.

Indians 
As of December 2016, the Indian community in Costa Rica consists of 250 residents, primarily employed in the country's IT industry. Out of these, twenty have renounced Indian citizenship and hold PIO cards.

Italians 

Italian migration to Costa Rica consists of several migratory waves between 1887 and 1888. In February 1887, the American railroad entrepreneur, Minor Cooper Keith, had four hundred men working on a new line, but needed more labor. In October of the same year, following unsuccessful attempts to persuade commissioners in Italy, the Canary Islands and Cape Verde, Keith traveled to London to arrange the import of Italian workers. On 10 May 1888, the Anna Elise docked in Limón (Costa Rica). It was carrying 671 workers. These Italians joined other immigrants from China and elsewhere building the first railway line in Costa Rica. The conditions were dangerous, and the Italians were angered by the deaths of many workers. In October 1888, the Italian workers called a strike, and on 20 October 1888, large numbers deserted the work camps and fled to Cartago (Costa Rica), where many settled, but others returned on a ship to Italy. They were replaced by 848 immigrants who came on 16 March 1889.

A group of Italians immigrated to the San Vito area in the mid-1950s. These agricultural colonists had to confront many problems, especially due to the isolation of this region. Nevertheless, from 1964 on, the production of coffee caused the outlook to change for the better, 500 Italian colonists and many Costa Ricans (someone descendants from the Italian rail workers) from different parts of the country were attracted by the economic possibilities that the area offered.

Currently, according to the census of 2012, there are 2,300 Italians in Costa Rica, and their descendants are found in Cartago.

Jamaican
For the construction of the Atlantic Railroad, Henry Meiggs Keith, an American hired by the Costa Rican government, insisted on utilizing "black" (later known as Afro-American) workers for clearing the forest and building the railroad tracks, and in 1872 the first group of Jamaicans entered the country. These Jamaicans and their descendants would become the main inhabitants of the Caribbean region of the country, thereby establishing a culture that was unique within Costa Rica. Two large Jamaican migrations occurred; firstly, during the railroad construction era, and then in the next century, for the banana plantations owned by the United Standard Fruit Company.

Japanese 
According to the census of 2012, the Japanese community in Costa Rica amounts to 190 people. The Japanese have developed many technological companies in the country.

Mexicans 

Costa Rica is most popular Central American country for Mexican immigration. The waves of migration from Mexico to Costa Rica started in 1970s, as people were attracted to its stable democracy, mild climate and political stability. According to the census of 2012, 4,285 Mexicans were living in Costa Rica from Nuevo León, Tamaulipas, Chihuahua, Baja California and Mexico City. They are typically professionals, doctors, secretaries, among other roles. Costa Rica is the ninth most popular destination for Mexican immigrants in the world.

Nicaraguans 
Nicaraguans constitute nearly three-quarters of the foreign-born population of Costa Rica. In 1984, there were 45,918 Nicaraguan-born people in Costa Rica. In 2012, the number had grown to around 287,000.

Panamanians 
According to the census of 2012, there are 11,427 Panamanians in Costa Rica. They mainly live in San José. They form 4.1% of the immigrant population, making them the fifth-largest immigrant community in Costa Rica.

Peruvians 
The census of 2012 found that nearly 2,700 Peruvians were living in Costa Rica. Some arrived directly from their country of origin, while others had emigrated first to Chile and then fled the anti-Peruvian sentiment in Chile. Although there are also cases of racism against Peruvians in Costa Rica, they occur to a lesser extent.

Polish 
Polish immigration to Costa Rica occurred from 1929 to 1941. In 1929, about fifteen Poles arrived in Costa Rica, with the number rising to 90 in 1930. Among the first Polish arrivals were Jewish immigrants Jacobo Schifter and Lollew Gudmundson, who left their country to settle in Costa Rica This became a motivator for many more Poles to go Costa Rica. The largest wave of immigration of Poles to Costa Rica was between 1933 and 1936. Xenophobia developed in Costa Rica, because most of the Poles were of Jewish origin. The Poles in Costa Rica were engaged in the home industry and small businesses. Later, around 1939, several waves of Jewish Polish families fleeing the Nazi repression arrived. Others followed after the war. By the 1950s, the majority left the country to emigrate to Mexico or Argentina. Currently the census of 2012 says there are 1,900 Poles in Costa Rica.

Russian and ex-Soviet peoples 
Russian and Soviet immigration to Costa Rica occurred during the twentieth century. The arrivals hail in greatest numbers from Volga, Belarus (including people from Ukraine and the Baltic countries), coming as refugees after the First World War and the Cold War. A number of Costa Ricans studied in the Soviet Union through scholarships, and came back married to Russians, establishing families in Costa Rica. According to the census of 2012, there are over 2,300 Russians in Costa Rica.

South Koreans 
Korean immigration is a recent phenomenon in Central America. The first Koreans came to Costa Rica in the 1990s, working in the clothing, automobile, restaurant and transportation businesses. There are many institutes and Korean associations. With a high percentage of Protestants among the population, some are missionaries of the Korean church. The Korean community is not large in Costa Rica, comprising 522 residents according to the census of 2012.

Spaniards 

Spanish immigration began with the exploration of Hernán Ponce de León and Juan de Castañeda along the Pacific coast in the early sixteenth century, who soon after placed the native population of this region under Spanish control. After independence, the governors were interested in populating the territories with white workers, preferably imported from Europe. Banana cultivation and labor for the construction of the railway to the Atlantic attracted foreign capital. In the census of 1864, there were only 41 Spaniards in Costa Rica, however, the number increased to 2,527 by 1927.

In the early twentieth century, many Spaniards used Costa Rica as a bridge to move to Panama, attracted by the construction of the Panama Canal. The events in Catalonia in the same time period prompted many Catalans to migrate to Costa Rica, becoming in a few years a thriving and influential community in San José that persists today. Currently, Catalans make up the largest portion of Spaniards in Costa Rica. According to the 2009 census, there are currently 16,482 Spanish citizens in Costa Rica.

Swiss 
Swiss people have immigrated to Costa Rica since the nineteenth century, and have been involved in the development of Costa Rican chocolate. According to the census of 2012, there are about 1,642 Swiss in Costa Rica.

Uruguayans 
According to the census of 2012, there are about 1,200 Uruguayans in Costa Rica. This country has recently proved attractive for Uruguayans entrepreneurs.

Venezuelans 
According to the census of 2012, there are about 3,886 Venezuelans in Costa Rica that live mainly in San José, in the areas of Escazú and Santa Ana. Most of them have arrived as refugees from political problems in their country. This population increased significantly from 2015 to 2019, mostly due to the Venezuelan political and economical crisis. Nowadays there are about 15,000 Venezuelans in Costa Rica.

See also 
 Demographics of Costa Rica
 Costa Rica Real Estate, Cost of Living and Real Estate Law

References

Notes 
1. The statistics of this page comes from the Wikipedia page in Spanish (Costa Rica) in section demography.
2. Some sections are partial translations of the Spanish Wikipedia page (Inmigracion en Costa Rica) and its creators.

Demographics of Costa Rica